Death in the City of Light: The Serial Killer of Nazi-Occupied Paris is a true crime book by David King first published in 2011. The book covers the serial killing spree in Paris that took place while that city was occupied by the Nazis during World War II, the trial of the chief suspect, Dr. Marcel Petiot, and the circus that ensued.

Laura Miller in Salon magazine calls Death in the City of Light better than Erik Larson's The Devil In The White City, saying that it lands "just shy of setting a new standard for the form." Kirkus Reviews concludes, "The author’s successful transition into the true-crime genre—expertly written and completely absorbing."

References

2011 non-fiction books
American non-fiction books
Non-fiction books about serial killers
History books about World War II
Books about Paris
Murder in France
France in World War II
Crown Publishing Group books